Ball Diamond is a baseball venue located on the campus of Ball State University in Muncie, Indiana, United States. It is home to the Ball State Cardinals baseball team, a member of the Division I Mid-American Conference.  The field has a capacity of 1,700 people.  Recent renovations to the field have added a new backstop, public address system, fencing, and scoreboard.

See also
 List of NCAA Division I baseball venues

References

College baseball venues in the United States
Baseball venues in Indiana
Ball State Cardinals baseball